Langezwaag is a village in the municipality of Opsterland in the east of Friesland, the Netherlands. It had a population of around 1,365 in January 2017.

The village was first mentioned in 1315 as Utresuagh, and means "long meadow with caddle". Kortezwaag was annexed by Gorredijk in 1962 and is now a neighbourhood. The Dutch Reformed church was built in 1781 as a replacement of a medieval church.

Langezwaag was home to 956 people in 1840.

Gallery

References

Populated places in Friesland
Geography of Opsterland